Winterthur Portfolio is an academic journal published by the University of Chicago Press. The journal covers articles on the arts in the United States and the historical context within which they were developed. Interdisciplinary articles study art and artifacts in their cultural framework. The journal is sponsored by the Winterthur Museum, Garden and Library. The journal's founding editor was curator Milo Naeve, who supervised production of the first three volumes between 1964 and 1967.

External links 
 Winterthur Portfolio homepage
 Winterthur Museum, Garden and Library

University of Chicago Press academic journals
Publications established in 1964
Arts journals
English-language journals
Winterthur Museum, Garden and Library